The 1894–95 Northern Football League season was the sixth in the history of the Northern Football League, a football competition in Northern England.

Clubs

The league featured 8 clubs which competed in the last season, along with two new clubs:
 Tow Law
 Howden Rangers

League table

References

1894-95
1894–95 in English association football leagues